San Lorenzo (formally La Bottega Del San Lorenzo) is an upmarket restaurant located at 22 Beauchamp Place in Knightsbridge, London. It was one of the favourite London restaurants of Diana, Princess of Wales and often visited by other celebrities.

About 
San Lorenzo opened in 1963. It serves northern Italian cuisine. It is a family operated restaurant by the owners Mara and Lorenzo Berni.

It is a popular celebrity visited restaurant. Some of its famous customers include: Princess Diana, Jack Nicholson, Rod Stewart, Courtney Cox, Margaret Thatcher, Eric Clapton, Marianne Faithfull, Madonna, Guy Ritchie, Kate Moss, Johnny Depp, Princess Diana, and Al Pacino.

See also
 List of restaurants in London
 List of Italian restaurants

References

External links
Osteria San Lorenzo

European restaurants in London
Buildings and structures in the Royal Borough of Kensington and Chelsea
Italian restaurants in the United Kingdom